In anatomy, the abdominal wall represents the boundaries of the abdominal cavity. The abdominal wall is split into the anterolateral and posterior walls.

There is a common set of layers covering and forming all the walls: the deepest being the visceral peritoneum, which covers many of the abdominal organs (most of the large and small intestines, for example), and the parietal peritoneum- which covers the visceral peritoneum below it, the extraperitoneal fat, the transversalis fascia, the internal and external oblique and transversus abdominis aponeurosis, and a layer of fascia, which has different names according to what it covers (e.g., transversalis, psoas fascia).

In medical vernacular, the term 'abdominal wall' most commonly refers to the layers composing the anterior abdominal wall which, in addition to the layers mentioned above, includes the three layers of muscle: the transversus abdominis (transverse abdominal muscle), the internal (obliquus internus) and the external oblique (obliquus externus).

Structure
The contour of abdominal wall is roughly hexagonal. Its superior border is bounded by the coastal margins, lateral borders by mid-axillary lines, and inferior borders bounded by the anterior half of the iliac crest, inguinal ligaments, pubic crest, and pubic symphysis.

Layers
In human anatomy, the layers of the anterolateral abdominal wall are (from superficial to deep):

 Skin
 Subcutaneous tissue
 Fascia
 Camper's fascia - fatty superficial layer.
 Scarpa's fascia - deep fibrous layer.
 Superficial Abdominal fascia
 Muscle
 External oblique abdominal muscle
 Internal oblique abdominal muscle
 Rectus abdominis
 Transverse abdominal muscle
 Pyramidalis muscle
 Transversalis fascia
 Extraperitoneal fat
 Peritoneum

Inner surface

The surface contains several ligaments separated by fossae:

See also
Abdominal exercise
Abdominal wall defect
Human abdomen
Peritoneum
Terms for anatomical location

References

External links
  - "Skeleton of the Abdomen", Wesley Norman, PhD, DSc
 
Anterolateral Abdominal Wall - University of Edinburgh Faculty of Medicine
Muscles of the Anterior Abdominal Wall - University of Arkansas
YouTube video of abdominal wall form Colorectal Disease Journal

Abdomen